Vigilantia (born  490) was a sister of Byzantine emperor Justinian I (r. 527–565), and mother to his successor Justin II (r. 565–574).

Name 

The name "Vigilantia" is Latin for "alertness, wakefulness". Itself deriving from "vigilia" (watch, watchfulness) and "vigil" ((1)adjective: awake, watching, alert (2)noun: watchman, sentinel).

Family 
Justinian (born 482) and Vigilantia were children of Vigilantia (born  455), a sister of Justin I (r. 518–527), founder of the Justinian dynasty. The family originated in Bederiana, near Naissus (modern Niš in Serbia) in Dacia Mediterranea. Procopius, Theodorus Lector, Zacharias Rhetor, Victor of Tunnuna, Theophanes the Confessor and Georgios Kedrenos consider Justin and his family Illyrians, though Kedrenos is uncertain. Evagrius Scholasticus, John Malalas, the Chronicon Paschale, the Suda, Joannes Zonaras and the Patria of Constantinople consider them Thraco-Romans. While Procopius reports them to be of peasant origins, Zonaras is the only source describing Justin I as a former herder.

Justinian was reportedly born in Tauresium, near Scupi, where their parents had apparently settled. Their father was named Sabbatius, while the name of their mother is not actually recorded. The name "Bigleniza" was assigned to the mother of Justinian and Vigilantia by Niccolò Alamanni (1583–1626), citing as his source a "Life of Justinian" (Latin: Vita Iustiniani) by "Theophilus Abbas", a supposed contemporary of Procopius. Despite repeated searches, this source has never been located by another scholar. Alamanni was trusted as a reliable source by several later authors, including Edward Gibbon, who in his The History of the Decline and Fall of the Roman Empire quotes the name Bigleniza and other details deriving from Alamanni. Since the name seemed to be Slavic in origin, later theories would develop on the Slavic origins of Justinian and his family. In 1883, James Bryce discovered a "Vita Justiniani" manuscript in the Palazzo Barberini. It only dated to the 17th century and contained all the facts mentioned by Alamanni, including Bigleniza considering her daughter-in-law Theodora, "not a gift of God but a gift of the devil." Bryce suggested this manuscript as Alamanni's source. Its authenticity however was doubtful, and Konstantin Josef Jireček considered this manuscript to be the work of Ivan Tomko Marnavich (1579–1639), archdeacon of Agram (Zagreb). Any other sources he used, if any, are unclear. Marnavich was a translator of medieval texts, particularly hagiographies. Bigleniza is merely a translation of Vigilantia to Slavic, following the long-standing theory that mother and daughter had the same name.

Whilst Vigilantia's relation to Justinian is mentioned by numerous historians, only Victor of Tunnuna names her husband and father of Justin II, Dulcidius (his name is also rendered as Dulcissimus).

Succession of Justinian 

Vigilantia is one of the figures featured in In laudem Justini minoris ("In praise of the younger Justin"), a poem by Flavius Cresconius Corippus written on the occasion of the accession of Justin II. It is more a eulogy than an actual chronicle. Both Vigilantia and her daughter-in-law Sophia, are called "divae", Latin for "divine ones, goddesses", and sources of the poet's inspiration, standing in for the Muses in that respect. Sophia, a niece of Theodora. is likely to have been his patroness and may have commissioned the poem. The Byzantinist Lynda Garland suggests that both Sophia and Vigilantia were Corippus' actual sources on various events, including "behind the scenes" activities.

Marriage and children 

Vigilantia and Dulcidius/Dulcissimus were parents of three known children:
Justin II, Byzantine emperor. Married Sophia.
Marcellus.
Praejecta.

References

Sources 
 
 
 
 
 

6th-century Byzantine people
Justinian dynasty
6th-century Byzantine women
Mothers of Byzantine emperors